The Dr. William Henry Cavell House, at 402 W. Robinson St. in Carson City, Nevada, United States, was built in 1907.  It is one of two Carson City houses constructed from the same plans, designed by Oakland, California architect John Conant.  It includes Shingle Style and Colonial Revival architectural elements.
It was listed on the National Register of Historic Places in 1987. It was deemed significant for association with dentist Dr. William Henry Cavell, and was originally a wedding gift from him to Ida Platt Cavell.  It stayed in the Cavell family until 1951.

References 

Colonial Revival architecture in Nevada
Houses completed in 1907
Houses on the National Register of Historic Places in Nevada
National Register of Historic Places in Carson City, Nevada
Shingle Style architecture in Nevada
Houses in Carson City, Nevada